List of Alpine two-thousanders may refer to:

 List of mountains of the Alps (2500–2999 m)
 List of mountains of the Alps (2000–2499 m)